Le Chauchet is a commune in the Creuse department in the Nouvelle-Aquitaine region in central France.

Geography

Population

Sights
 The eighteenth-century church.
 A medieval bridge over the Tardes.

See also
Communes of the Creuse department

References

Communes of Creuse